The Biesterfeld AG is the strategic holding of the Biesterfeld group of companies, a distributor for plastics and chemicals with subsidiaries in more than 30 countries worldwide. The headquarters of the family-owned company is in Hamburg, Germany.

History 

In 1906, W. Biesterfeld & Co. was founded by the wholesaler and import/export trader Wilhelm Ernst Hinrich Biesterfeld. The company started in trading with salt. Chemicals and fertilizers were established as a second pillar of the company in the 1930s.  In-house products were developed, and international business started.

Walter Biesterfeld joined the company in 1930. After his death his son Dirk J. Biesterfeld took over the family business as General Partner in 1970, and developed it into an internationally operating group.

Today the Biesterfeld group is specialized in the distribution of plastics, rubbers and specialty chemicals as well as the international chemical trade. The parent company Wilhelm E. H. Biesterfeld GmbH & Co. KG changed its legal status in 2004,  and became the strategic holding of the group, called since then Biesterfeld AG.

Business activities 

The four core business divisions, Biesterfeld Plastic, Biesterfeld Spezialchemie, Biesterfeld Performance Rubber and Biesterfeld International, as well as the service units BIT-SERV (IT-Services) and Biesterfeld ChemLogS (Logistics and Services), are all consolidated under one roof – the Biesterfeld AG.

External links 

 
 Company Members of the European Association of Chemical Distributors

References 

 Biesterfeld at a glance

Chemical companies of Germany
Companies based in Hamburg